"Vengeance" (stylized VENGEANCE | VENGEANCE) is a song  by rapper Denzel Curry featuring JPEGMafia and ZillaKami. The song was released as the fourth single from Curry's third studio album, Ta13oo, alongside a video on September 5, 2018.

Music videos

A visual was released alongside Ta13oo on July 27, 2018. It shows clips from the video game Yandere Simulator, where a character beats peers to death. The footage is shared with "The Blackest Balloon" and "Black Metal Terrorist (BMT)", which are all other songs from Act 3 of Ta13oo.

The music video was released on September 5, 2018. The video is shown in the style of a comic book, with the video game from the first video being shown as well. The video was called "trippy" and "graphic" upon release. It could also be seen as a sequel to the video to Curry's Clout Cobain video.

References

2018 singles
2018 songs
Denzel Curry songs 
Alternative hip hop songs
Hardcore hip hop songs
Southern hip hop songs